Shaghayegh Dehghan (born February 1, 1979) is an Iranian actress. She has received various accolades, including three Hafez Awards nominations.

Career
Shaghayegh Dehqan was born in Germany, three months before her family returned to Iran. At the age of 17, she started her career as a puppeteer. At the same time, she turned to writing scripts for children’s TV shows and later, made her acting debut, appearing in a movie for kids.

So far, she has appeared in series Twenty (1998), Tiptoe (2002), Aqaqiya Alley (2003), Barareh Nights (2005), Mozaffar's Garden (2006), The Night Shall Pass (2008), The Man of a Thousand Faces (2007), The Passengers (2009), Stepmother (2010), Medical Building (2011), Detour (2011), Cops and Robbers (2012), Mehrabad (2013) and Pejman (2013). Dehqan has also appeared in movies, including Under the Moonlight (2000), Cinderella (2001) and Treasure of Javaher Poshte (2011).

Personal life
She married Mehrab Ghasemkhani in 2002, who is an Iranian screenwriter. They have a son, Noyan who was born in 2007. The couple separated in 2018. Her former brother-in-law, Peyman Ghasemkhani is also a writer and his former spouse, Bahareh Rahnama, is an actress.

Filmography

Film 
Zir-e noor-e-mah (aka Under the moonlight)
Gohar ( directed by Manouchehr Hadi )

Home Video

Television 
farda dair ast (directed by Hassan Fathi - 1998)
Pavarchin (aka Tiptoe - 2002 - TV series)
Acacia Alley (2003- 2004 - TV series)
Kamarband ha ra bebandid (aka Fasten your seatbelts)
Shabhaye Barareh (aka Barare Nights - 2006 - TV series)
Faza Navardan (2006 - TV series)
Baghe Mozaffar (aka Mozaffar's Garden - 2007 - TV series)
Marde Hezar Chehreh (aka Thousand-Face Man - 2008 - TV series)
Sakhteman Pezeshkan (aka Doctors' Building - 2011 - TV series)
Pejman (2013 - TV series)
Dorehami (gathering - 2016 - Telecast)

References

External links

1979 births
Living people
Iranian comedians
People from Giessen
Iranian women writers
Iranian film actresses
Iranian stage actresses
Iranian stand-up comedians
Iranian television actresses